Ania Fucz (born ) is a German female kickboxer and mixed martial artist of Polish descent, based in Würselen, Germany. She competes professionally since 2005 and was the ISKA Welterweight champion.

Life
The native Pole Ania Fucz moved to Germany with her family at the age of eight. She now lives in Wurselen near Aachen. There she also exercises her profession as a banker.

Sports career

Ania Fucz came quite late to kickboxing. The foundation for her career as a Muay Thai fighter was placed on a visit to a martial arts event. Their active phase began in 2005, initially with the amateurs. As a member of the German national team, she played numerous battles abroad, in South Korea, China and more in Thailand. Since 2013, she has also been active as a mixed martial arts fighter.

Fucz has been trained for many years by Uwe Göbkes in the martial arts center mujoken-ki-dojo. According to Göbke, she is the most athletic sportsman he has ever experienced. She herself is now supervising and training the youngest offspring. In 2014 she moved her sporty home to the University of Fighting in Düsseldorf.

Most important achievements of their sports career

Kickboxing 

In 2005, Fucz joined the association mujoken-ki-Dojo, and in the following year, he was already NRW-Landesmeisterin and German Vizemeisterin Muay Thai. In 2007, she was able to defend her title as NRW regional champion. In addition, Fucz contested their first bouts in K-1 among the pros. The title of German champion and European champion won Fucz in 2008. She had her first fight in Thailand, the motherland of her sport, which ended victoriously for her. As a member of the national team, she took part in the World Cup in South Korea. In 2009, Fucz contested a fight at the King's Cup in Bangkok, an event regularly attended by more than 120,000 spectators. It was followed by the participation in the World Cup in Thailand, from which she took home a bronze medal. For the pros, she became the European champion in K-1 by the version of I.K.B.F. In the same year, a successful title defense was achieved. The first world championship belt of the I.K.B.F. Ania Fucz was able to strap on on 5 June 2010. As the only German, she fought at the first Sportaccord Combat Games in China and won a bronze medal. Winner of the European Cup in Dresden was Fucz in 2011 and defended this year her world title again with a victory. On May 18, 2012, Fucz entered a full-fledged WKA World Cup in full-contact kickboxing against the undefeated Christine Theiss, who lost her by points. Already 15 days later, she again rose into the ring to defend her own title. Against the Swede Elna Nilsson, she won a clear point victory at the Championsnight II in Aachen. On September 1, 2012, Fucz contested the only female fight of the main program at the Mix Fight Gala XIII in the Fraport Arena. Against the Dutch Sarah Debaieb, a unanimous victory after points. On June 8, 2013, Fucz, for the first time in her new ISKA association, won a world championship match against the Dutch Salaysa van den Bos at the Champions Night III in Aachen. The combatants regarded the fight unanimously for Fucz.

Mixed Martial Arts

Ania Fucz at the event "German MMA Championship GMC 4 next level" in Herne on July 6, 2013, debuted in MMA. She won against Jana Lorenz by unanimous decision-making by the camp champions. As part of the Champions Night IV on September 7, 2013, she was to fight her second MMA fight. Due to several short-term injuries-related cancellations, the event was moved to a date to be determined. On 29 November 2014 Fucz then contested their second fight in the context of the event "It's Lanna Time 2" in Bochum. In round 2, she won over Cinja Kiefer through TKO.

Titles
2014 – IKBO World Champion, 61 kg
2014 – ISKA World Champion K1
2014 – I.K.B.F. World Champion K1
2014 – ISKA World Welterweight Title (66 kg)

Kickboxing record

|- style="background:#fdd;"
|
| style="text-align:center;"|Loss
| Marija Malenica
|SUPERKOMBAT: Paraschiv vs. Ngimbi
| Bucharest, Romania
| style="text-align:center;"|Decision (unanimous)
|align=center|3
|align=center|3:00
| style="text-align:center;"|
|-
! style=background:white colspan=9 |
|- style="background:#cfc;"
|
| style="text-align:center;"|Win
| Eliška Pelechova
|Ladies Fight Night 3: The FeMMAgeddon
| Warsaw, Poland
| style="text-align:center;"|Decision (unanimous)
|align=center|3
|align=center|3:00
| style="text-align:center;"|
|-
|- style="background:#cfc;"
|
| style="text-align:center;"|Win
| Ilsury Hendrikse
|W5 European League XXXIV
| Zagreb, Croatia
| style="text-align:center;"|Decision (unanimous)
|align=center|3
|align=center|3:00
| style="text-align:center;"|
|-
|- style="background:#cfc;"
|
| style="text-align:center;"|Win
| Lucia Krajčovič
|Full Fight 1: Slovakia & Czech vs Russia
| Banská Bystrica, Slovakia
| style="text-align:center;"|Decision (unanimous)
|align=center|3
|align=center|3:00
| style="text-align:center;"|
|-
|- style="background:#cfc;"
|
| style="text-align:center;"|Win
| Lisa Schewe
|Night for Masters
| Mülheim an der Ruhr, Germany
| style="text-align:center;"|Points
|align=center|5
|align=center|3:00
| style="text-align:center;"|
|-
! style=background:white colspan=9 |
|- style="background:#cfc;"
|
| style="text-align:center;"|Win
| Salaysa van den Bos
|Champions Night 3
| Aachen, Germany
| style="text-align:center;"|Points
|align=center|5
|align=center|3:00
| style="text-align:center;"|
|-
! style=background:white colspan=9 |
|- style="background:#cfc;"
|
| style="text-align:center;"|Win
| Sarah Debaieb
|Mix Fight Gala 13
| Frankfurt, Germany
| style="text-align:center;"|Decision (unanimous)
|align=center|3
|align=center|3:00
| style="text-align:center;"|
|-
|- style="background:#cfc;"
|
| style="text-align:center;"|Win
| Elna Nilsson
|Champions Night 2
| Aachen, Germany
| style="text-align:center;"|Decision 
|align=center|5
|align=center|3:00
| style="text-align:center;"|
|-
! style=background:white colspan=9 |
|- style="background:#fdd;"
|
| style="text-align:center;"|Loss
| Christine Theiss
|Steko's Fight Night
| Munich, Germany
| style="text-align:center;"|Decision (unanimous)
|align=center|10
|align=center|2:00
| style="text-align:center;"|
|-
! style=background:white colspan=9 |
|- style="background:#cfc;"
|
| style="text-align:center;"|Win
| Chajmaa Bellakhal
|Masters Fight Night 
| Duisburg, Germany
| style="text-align:center;"|Decision 
|align=center|5
|align=center|3:00
| style="text-align:center;"|
|-
! style=background:white colspan=9 |
|- style="background:#cfc;"
|
| style="text-align:center;"|Win
| Pimnipa Tanawatpipat
|Fight Night Würselen
| Würselen, Germany
| style="text-align:center;"|Points
|align=center|5
|align=center|3:00
| style="text-align:center;"|
|-
! style=background:white colspan=9 |
|- style="background:#cfc;"
|
| style="text-align:center;"|Win
| Chajmaa Bellakhal
|Battle of the South 8
| Hoensbroek, Netherlands
| style="text-align:center;"|Points
|align=center|3
|align=center|3:00
| style="text-align:center;"|
|-
|- style="background:#fdd;"
|
| style="text-align:center;"|Loss
| Sandra Bastian
|King's Birthday 2009 Show
| Bangkok, Thailand
| style="text-align:center;"|Decision
|align=center|4
|align=center|2:00
| style="text-align:center;"|
|-
|- style="background:#cfc;"
|
| style="text-align:center;"|Win
| Jessica Toledo Galvan
|The Champions Club 2008
| Bamberg, Germany
| style="text-align:center;"|Decision (unanimous)
|align=center|3
|align=center|3:00
| style="text-align:center;"|
|-
! style=background:white colspan=9 |
|- style="background:#fdd;"
|
| style="text-align:center;"|Loss
| Nathalie Zoukatas
|Sinbi Muay Thai Event
| Ko Samui, Thailand
| style="text-align:center;"|Decision (unanimous)
|align=center|3
|align=center|3:00
| style="text-align:center;"|
|-
|- style="background:#cfc;"
|
| style="text-align:center;"|Win
| Charlotte von Baumgarten
|The Champions Club 2007
| Bamberg, Germany
| style="text-align:center;"|Decision
|align=center|3
|align=center|2:00
| style="text-align:center;"|
|-
! style=background:white colspan=9 |
|-
| colspan=9 | Legend:

Mixed martial arts record

|Win
|align=center|3–0
|Renáta Cseh-Lantos
|Decision (unanimous)
|Respect Fighting Championship 12
|
|align=center|5
|align=center|5:00
|Wuppertal, Germany
|
|-
|Win
|align=center|2–0
|Cinja Kiefer
|TKO (punches)
|MMA Bundesliga: It's Lanna Time 2
|
|align=center|2
|align=center|0:49
|Bochum, Germany
|
|-
|Win
|align=center|1–0
|Jana Lorenz
|Decision (unanimous)
|German MMA Championship 4: Next Level
|
|align=center|3
|align=center|5:00
|Herne, Germany
|

References

1981 births
Sportspeople from Aachen
German female kickboxers
German people of Polish descent
Living people
German female mixed martial artists
German Muay Thai practitioners
Flyweight mixed martial artists
Mixed martial artists utilizing boxing
Mixed martial artists utilizing Muay Thai
Welterweight kickboxers
Female Muay Thai practitioners
SUPERKOMBAT kickboxers